The LaGrange Daily News has been serving LaGrange and the residents of Troup County, Georgia and surrounding areas since 1843 when it was launched as a weekly newspaper called the LaGrange Herald. The name was changed later to the Chattahoochee and in the 1860s, The LaGrange Reporter. After a merger of the LaGrange Reporter, LaGrange Graphic and LaGrange Shuttle in 1928, the combined publications became the LaGrange Daily News.

LaGrange Daily News is a newspaper owned by Boone Newspapers, Inc. which owns community newspapers throughout the Southeast, Texas, Minnesota, Kentucky, Ohio and Michigan. Boone acquired the paper from Civitas Media in 2016.

It is printed two times a week (Wednesday and Saturday), with on-line editions available Tuesday through Saturday.

References

External links

 LaGrange Daily News

Newspapers published in Georgia (U.S. state)